The Mosul Vilayet was a first-level administrative division (vilayet) of the Ottoman Empire. It was created from the northern sanjaks of the Baghdad Vilayet in 1878.

The accuracy of the population figures ranges from "approximate" to "merely conjectural" depending on the region from which they were gathered.

The city of Mosul and the area south to the Little Zab was allocated to France in the 1916 Sykes-Picot Agreement of the First World War, and later transferred to Mandatory Iraq following Mosul Question.

Administrative divisions

Sanjaks of the vilayet:
 Mosul Sanjak (Mosul)
 Kerkük Sanjak (Kirkuk)
 Sulaymaniyah Sanjak (Sulaymaniyah)

See also
Mosul Question 
Iraqi Kurdistan
Kingdom of Kurdistan

Notes

External links
 

Vilayets of the Ottoman Empire in Asia
Ottoman Iraq
1878 establishments in the Ottoman Empire
History of Upper Mesopotamia
1918 disestablishments in the Ottoman Empire